Roshal is a town in Moscow Oblast, Russia, located on the Voymega River  east of Moscow. Population:

History
Roshal was founded in 1916 as a settlement of Krestov Brod. It was renamed Roshal in 1917 in honor of a Bolshevik Semyon Roshal (1896–1917) and granted town status in 1940.

Administrative and municipal status
Within the framework of administrative divisions, it is incorporated as Roshal Town Under Oblast Jurisdiction—an administrative unit with the status equal to that of the districts. As a municipal division, Roshal Town Under Oblast Jurisdiction is incorporated as Roshal Urban Okrug.

Notable residents 

Valeriy Saratov (born 1953), Ukrainian politician

References

Notes

Sources

Cities and towns in Moscow Oblast